Terminator: The Sarah Connor Chronicles – Original Television Soundtrack is the first soundtrack album release from the science fiction television series of the same name based on the Terminator franchise. The score is licensed for release by Warner Bros. Entertainment to La-La Land Records who issued the soundtrack album on December 23, 2008.

Composed by Bear McCreary, it features the series opening title and closing themes as well as stand-out themes and musical cues from various episodes of the show's first season and from the first two episodes of the second season. The soundtrack also includes a cover of the Rev. Gary Davis gospel song "Samson and Delilah", arranged by McCreary and performed by Shirley Manson, who joined the series cast at the start of the second season.

Series producer Josh Friedman, actors Thomas Dekker and Shirley Manson, as well as McCreary each contribute personal notes within the release sleeve-notes.

Track listing

Compiling the album
The Terminator: The Sarah Connor Chronicles soundtrack collects several character themes (Sarah Connor, Derek Reese and Catherine Weaver's themes feature, as do variations on James Ellison and Andy Goode's themes) and also collects some other stand out pieces featured across the series first eleven episodes. Although Terminator Cameron is a central character in the show, no theme was written for her.

"Samson and Delilah"
In April 2008, before production on the second season of Terminator... was announced, Josh Friedman wanted the season to begin with a companion piece to the final episode of the first, in which antagonist Terminator Cromartie massacres an HRT led by series regular James Ellison to the musical accompaniment of Johnny Cash's "The Man Comes Around". Friedman became aware of a video of gospel song "Samson and Delilah" performed live by Bruce Springsteen, which had been uploaded to YouTube. The audio from the video would be unusable for a television broadcast, and as Springsteen never recorded a studio version of the song, Friedman asked McCreary if he could arrange a version of it to open the second season of the show.

After spending some time concentrating on other projects, McCreary decided the track would work best with a gospel arrangement incorporated with elements from the Terminator... score. While discussing the concept with Friedman, McCreary discovered that Garbage vocalist Shirley Manson had been recently cast as a recurring T-1001 Terminator for the series' second season. McCreary asked for Manson to be the vocalist on "Samson and Delilah", leaving it up to Friedman to ask Manson to do it. After Manson agreed, McCreary presented a rough demo of the track to both Friedman and Manson. Friedman gave creative control over the track to McCreary and Manson, who wanted the track to "have a somewhat authentic quality to it, rather than be traditionally orchestrated like most cinematic scores".

McCreary recorded the rhythm sections of the song with Ira Ingber and Steve Bartek on guitars, John Avila on bass and Nate Wood on drums, while Steve Kaplan co-produced and engineered the music. After McCreary recorded the orchestration and rock instrument elements to the track, Manson recorded the vocals with her engineer Billy Bush.

"Ain't We Famous"
For the second episode of season two, McCreary was required to choose music to play on a jukebox during a bar scene involving Cameron playing pool undercover. Rather than write a brand new composition, McCreary chose a song titled "Ain't We Famous", written by his brother, giving his band the chance to record a studio version of the track.

"Atomic Al's Merry Melody"
During the same episode, both Sarah Connor and Cameron view a safety training video featuring an animated character named "Atomic Al". McCreary composed an orchestral animation score for the 45-second expository sequence, inspired by composers Carl Stalling's Looney Tunes themes, Scott Bradley's Tom and Jerry themes and Bruce Broughton's Tiny Toon Adventures theme.

"Atomic Al's Merry Melody" is also used in the background of the second episode of Caprica, when Lacy has lunch at the home of Sister Clarice Willow.

Credits & personnel
 
 
 Performers
 Violin: Benedikt Brydern, Paul Cartwright, Anna Stafford, Martin St. Pierre, Erica Walzak
 Baritone violin: Robert Anderson
 Violincello: Jacob Szekely
 Woodwinds: Chris Bleth
 Additional woodwinds: John Yoaklim
 Acoustic & electric guitars: Steve Bartek, Ira Ingber
 Electric bass: John Avila
 Drum kit: Nate Wood
 Metallic drums & other percussion: M.B. Gordy
 Additional sequencing: Jonathan Snipes
 MIDI programming: Bear McCreary

 Publishing
All tracks published by Warner-Olive Music, LLC (ASCAP) except:
 Track 1: Published by Chandos Music Co. (ASCAP)
 Track 9: Published by Remixnoise (ASCAP)
 Track 14: Published by Conan the Furky Music (ASCAP)

Track 2 includes "The Terminator Theme" published by Universal - Polygram Int. Publ, Inc. (ASCAP) o/b/o Euphonius Music (ASCAP)
 
 Production
Executive album producers: Josh Friedman, John Wirth and James Middleton
Soundtrack album producers: MV Gerhard, Matt Verboys and Ford A. Thaxton
Music produced by: Bear McCreary and Steve Kaplan
Score orchestrated by: Brendan Roberts and Bear McCreary
Score recorded and mixed by: Steve Kaplan
Assistant engineers: Laurence Schwarz and Paul E. Sobosky
Music editor: Michael Beber
Digitally edited and mastered by: James Nelson at Digital Outland
Contractor: Aaron A. Roathe
Scoring assistants: Michael Beach, Brendan McCreary and Jonathan Ortega
CD art direction: Mark Banning
Executive for Warner Bros. Television: Bronwyn Savasta
Business affairs for Warner Bros. Television: Keith Zajic and Dick Herbert

References

External links
Terminator: The Sarah Connor Chronicles at BearMccreary.com
Soundtrack listing at La-La Land Records

Television soundtracks
Terminator: The Sarah Connor Chronicles
2008 soundtrack albums